Northern Ireland Universities Air Squadron is a University Air Squadron connected to the Queen’s University Belfast and Ulster University, Northern Ireland, United Kingdom.

References

Royal Air Force university air squadrons